Sang-e Sefid (also Romanized as Sang-e Sefīd and Sangsefīd) is a village in Qatruyeh Rural District, Qatruyeh District, Neyriz County, Fars Province, Iran. At the 2006 census, its population was 77, in 20 families.

References 

Populated places in Neyriz County